The 2020 Arizona Wildcats football team represented the University of Arizona in the 2020 NCAA Division I FBS football season. Arizona was led by third-year head coach Kevin Sumlin, in the Wildcats' 121st season. The Wildcats played in the South Division (11th season) of the Pac-12 Conference, and played their home games at Arizona Stadium in Tucson, Arizona (93rd season).

On August 11, the Pac-12 Conference initially canceled all fall sports competitions due to the COVID-19 pandemic. On September 24, the conference announced that a six-game conference-only season would begin on November 6, with the Pac-12 Championship Game to be played December 18. Teams not selected for the championship game would be seeded to play a seventh game.

On December 12, 2020, Sumlin was fired after three seasons following a 70–7 loss to ASU in the Territorial Cup on December 11, 2020. He finished at Arizona with an overall record of 9–20 and 6–17 against the Pac-12. On December 23, 2020, the University of Arizona hired Jedd Fisch as the 32nd head coach.

Previous season

The Wildcats finished the 2019 season 4–8, 2–7 in Pac-12 play to finish in last place in the South Division.

Offseason
The Wildcats have 12 senior graduates only graduated players noted until spring practice. As well as 2 junior players would choose to forgo their senior season in pursuit of an early NFL career.

Recruiting

Transfers
The Wildcats lose multiple players due to various reasons.

Outgoing

Incoming

Position key

Returning starters

Offense

Defense

Special teams

† Indicates player was a starter in 2019 but missed all of 2020 due to injury.

Preseason

Award watch lists
Listed in the order that they were released

Pac-12 Media Day
The Pac-12 Media Day was held in July 2020 in Hollywood, California.

Preseason All-Pac-12 teams

Personnel

Coaching staff

Roster

Depth chart
Starters and backups.

Depth Chart Source: 2020 Arizona Wildcats Football Fact Book

True Freshman
Double Position : *

Schedule

Spring game
The 2020 Wildcats began spring practice on March 2, 2020 and finish with the 2020 Arizona spring game. The remainder of spring practice and the spring game were  canceled on March 18, 2020, due to the  ongoing Coronavirus pandemic.

Regular season
Arizona had scheduled non–conference games against Hawaii, Portland State, and Texas Tech but canceled these games on July 10 due to the Pac-12 Conference's decision to play a conference-only schedule due to the COVID-19 pandemic.

Game summaries

USC

 Sources:

Statistics

Arizona will host USC. Last season, the Trojans defeated the Wildcats, 41–14.

Washington

 Sources:

Statistics

Arizona will host Washington. Last season, the Huskies defeated the Wildcats, 51–27.

at UCLA

 Sources:

Statistics

Arizona will travel to Pasadena, CA to face UCLA. Last season, the Wildcats defeated the Bruins, 20–17.

Colorado

 Sources:

Statistics

The Wildcats scored 13 unanswered points to begin the game, but the Buffalo scored 24 straight, beginning midway in the 2nd quarter, to win 24–13.

Arizona State

 Sources:

Statistics

Arizona committed seven turnovers as Arizona State scored 70 points, the most points scored in the history of the Territorial Cup. The Wildcats used three different quarterbacks in the game, none of which broke 100 yards passing; Will Plummer finished 7-of-13 for 83 yards, Grant Gunnell went 12-of-17 for 78 yards with one interception and one lost fumble, and Rhett Rodriguez finished 7-of-16 for 52 yards with two interceptions. Running back Gary Brightwell lost three fumbles. The defeat was so devastating that head coach Kevin Sumlin was fired the following day.

Statistics

Scores by quarter

Rankings

Players drafted into the NFL

Media affiliates

Radio
 ESPN Radio – (ESPN Tucson 1490 AM & 104.09 FM) – Nationwide (Dish Network, Sirius XM, TuneIn radio and iHeartRadio)
 KCUB 1290 AM – Football Radio Show – (Tucson, AZ)
 KHYT – 107.5 FM (Tucson, AZ)
 KTKT 990 AM – La Hora de Los Gatos (Spanish) – (Tucson, AZ)
 KGME 910 AM – (IMG Sports Network) – (Phoenix, AZ)
 KTAN 1420 AM – (Sierra Vista, AZ)
 KDAP 96.5 FM (Douglas, Arizona)
 KWRQ 102.3 FM – (Safford, AZ/Thatcher, AZ)
 KIKO 1340 AM – (Globe, AZ)
 KVWM 970 AM – (Show Low, AZ/Pinetop-Lakeside, AZ)
 XENY 760 – (Nogales, Sonora) (Spanish)

TV
 CBS Family – KOLD (CBS), CBSN
 ABC/ESPN Family – KGUN (ABC), ABC, ESPN, ESPN2, ESPNU, ESPN+,
 FOX Family – KMSB (FOX), FOX/FS1, FSN
 Pac-12 Network (Pac-12 Arizona)
 NBC – KVOA, NBC Sports, NBCSN

References

Arizona
Arizona Wildcats football seasons
College football winless seasons
Arizona Wildcats football